Oliver St Clair (died 1523) was a Scottish noble and the 12th Baron of Roslin.

Early life

He was the eldest son of the second marriage of William Sinclair, 1st Earl of Caithness, 2nd Lord Sinclair and 11th Baron of Roslin to Marjory Sutherland, daughter of Sutherland of Duffus. His father had a son from his first marriage to Elizabeth Douglas, William Sinclair, 3rd Lord Sinclair, who although inherited the Lordship of Sinclair was apparently disinherited of the Barony of Roslin which went to Oliver and also of the earldom of Caithness which went to Oliver's younger brother, another William Sinclair.

Lands and estates

On 9 September 1476 Oliver St Clair received from his father the baronies of Roslin, Pentland, and Pentland Muir, the barony of Herbertshire, the lands of Cousland, the barony of Ravenscraig, Dubbo, Carberry and Dysart. This was confirmed by charter from James III of Scotland on 10 September 1476. However, Oliver St Clair later gave to his brother, William Sinclair, 3rd Lord Sinclair who was also known as "of Newburgh", the lands of Cousland, Dysart and Ravenscraig with the castles in return for William and his son Henry renouncing their claims to the Barony of Roslin.

Feud with Lord Borthwick

Oliver St Clair entered into a feud with Lord Borthwick which lasted for several years after St Clair threw one of the Borthwicks over the drawbridge at Roslin Castle after dinner.

Rosslyn Chapel

Oliver St Clair completed the construction of Rosslyn Chapel, which had been started by his father.

Family

Oliver St Clair was married firstly to Christian Haldane, secondly to Elizabeth, daughter of William Borthwick, 3rd Lord Borthwick, and thirdly to Isabella Livingstone. He had the following children:

George St Clair, fiar of Roslin, who married Agnes, daughter of Robert Crichton, Lord Sanquhar. He died in 1510.
William St Clair, 13th Baron of Roslin.
Henry Sinclair, Bishop of Ross.
Oliver Sinclair, of Pitcairns. He commanded the Scottish army at the Battle of Solway Moss.
John Sinclair, Bishop of Brechin.
Alexander St Clair, who received a charter for lands from James V of Scotland in 1541.
Arthur St Clair, who received a charter for lands from Andrew Durie, Abbot of Melrose in 1539.
James St Clair, who received a charter for lands from Mr Henry St Clair, son of Oliver St Clair of Roslin.
Margaret St Clair, who married Sir Thomas Kirkpatrick of Closeburn.

See also

Lord Sinclair
Earl of Caithness
Lord Herdmanston

References

Barons of Roslin
Clan Sinclair
1525 deaths